is a Japanese professional wrestler, currently signed to All Japan Pro Wrestling (AJPW). He previously worked for Osaka Pro Wrestling under the ring name . His ring name and original wrestling attire were inspired by the Hanshin Tigers baseball team.

Professional wrestling career
On February 8, 2014, Tigers Mask announced his resignation from Osaka Pro, effective April 20, after which he began working in the Tokyo area under a new persona. On April 22, 2014, Maruyama made his first appearance unmasked, announcing that in the future he would be working under his real name.

In January 2018, Maruyama signed with All Japan Pro Wrestling (AJPW) and adopted the name  in 2020.

Championships and accomplishments 
All Japan Pro Wrestling
All Asia Tag Team Championship (1 time) – with Zeus
Gaora TV Championship (1 time)
World Junior Heavyweight Championship (1 time)
Jr. Tag Battle of Glory (2017) – with Masashi Takeda
DDT Pro-Wrestling
IMGP World Heavyweight Championship (2 times, current)
Ironman Heavymetalweight Championship (2 times)
Dragon Gate
Open the Brave Gate Championship (1 time)
Kaientai Dojo
Independent World Junior Heavyweight Championship (3 times)
Mexican Wrestling Federation
MWF World Junior Heavyweight Championship (1 time)
Michinoku Pro Wrestling
Tohoku Tag Team Championship (1 time) – with Flash Moon
Iron Man Tournament (2008)
Osaka Pro Wrestling
CMLLL World Super Mexico Championship (1 time, current)
Osaka Light Heavyweight Championship (1 time, current)
Osaka Pro Wrestling Battle Royal Championship (1 time)
Osaka Pro Wrestling Owarai Championship (2 times)
Osaka Meibutsu Sekaiichi Championship (1 time)
Osaka Pro Wrestling Championship (4 times)
Osaka Pro Wrestling Tag Team Championship (3 times) – with Billyken Kid (1) and Black Buffalo (2)
Osaka Tag Festival (2006) – with Flash Moon
Osaka Tag Festival (2007) – with Billyken Kid
Osaka Tag Festival (2011) – with Black Buffalo
Tenno-zan (2007)
Pro Wrestling Illustrated
Ranked No. 232 of the top 500 singles wrestlers in the PWI 500 in 2022
Pro Wrestling Zero1
NWA International Lightweight Tag Team Championship (1 time) – with Billyken Kid

References

External links 

 

1976 births
Living people
Japanese male professional wrestlers
Sportspeople from Osaka Prefecture
People from Takatsuki, Osaka
Masked wrestlers
All Asia Tag Team Champions
World Junior Heavyweight Champions (AJPW)
Gaora TV Champions
Tohoku Tag Team Champions
21st-century professional wrestlers
Independent World Junior Heavyweight Champions
Ironman Heavymetalweight Champions
Open the Brave Gate Champions